Claire-Louise Vaculik (née Leyland) is an English Conservative politician.  She was the leader of the Conservatives on Camden London Borough Council from 2014 to 2018, and represented Belsize on the council from 2010 to 2018.  She has stood unsuccessfully for Parliament twice: in West Tyrone in 2015 and her home seat of Hampstead and Kilburn in 2017.

Early life and education 
Leyland was born in South Africa and attended Wynberg Girls' High School in Cape Town, followed by Stellenbosch University and Rhodes University. She moved to London in 1998 to study further at Goldsmiths and Middlesex University.

Career 
Leyland is an art therapist by profession, and is the chair of the British Association of Art Therapists, the British professional body for art therapists. She edited the book Integrative Arts Psychotherapy.

Leyland was elected to Camden London Borough Council in 2010 to represent Belsize, and won the seat back from the Liberal Democrats. She became the leader of the Conservatives in 2013 (when they were the third largest party) and became the leader of the opposition in 2014, when the Liberal Democrats lost all but one seat. As leader of the opposition, she made national news by advocating more CCTV in Belsize Park, and criticising Camden Council for spending money on publicising the fact it had no money.

At the 2015 general election, Leyland stood as the Conservative candidate for West Tyrone in Northern Ireland. She came eighth and lost her deposit, being just three votes ahead of the last-placed candidate. It was the party's sixth-lowest vote share at that election.

Leyland voted to remain in the 2016 EU referendum. She was selected for Hampstead and Kilburn at the 2017 general election, beating Henry Newman and Kemi Badenoch, and her candidacy in the strongly anti-Brexit constituency was dubbed 'Clash of the Remainers'. She was criticised for downplaying being a Conservative and instead being promoted as "Theresa May's candidate". Leyland finished as a distant second, with a large swing towards the Labour incumbent, Tulip Siddiq. Leyland stood down from Camden Council in 2018.

References 

Alumni of Goldsmiths, University of London
Alumni of Middlesex University
Art therapists
Councillors in the London Borough of Camden
Conservative Party (UK) councillors
Conservative Party (UK) parliamentary candidates
Living people
Rhodes University alumni
South African emigrants to the United Kingdom
South African women in politics
Stellenbosch University alumni
White South African people
Women councillors in England
Year of birth missing (living people)